Pioneer Memorial is an outdoor 1936 granite obelisk by Frank Teich, erected in Hermann Park in Houston, Texas, in the United States.

See also

 1936 in art
 List of public art in Houston

References

External links
 

1936 establishments in Texas
1936 sculptures
Granite sculptures in Texas
Monuments and memorials in Texas
Obelisks in the United States
Outdoor sculptures in Houston
Hermann Park